Liberia competed at the 1972 Summer Olympics in Munich, West Germany.  The nation returned to the Olympic Games after missing the 1968 Summer Olympics.

Results by event

Athletics
Men's 100 metres
Andrew Sartee
 First Heat — 11.09s (→ did not advance)

Men's 800 metres
Thomas O'Brien Howe
 Heat — 2:00.7 (→ did not advance)

Men's 1500 metres
Edward Kar
 Heat — 4:21.4 (→ did not advance)

Men's 4 × 100 m Relay
Andrew Sartee, Thomas O'Brien Howe, Dominic Saidu, and Thomas Nma
 Heat — DNF (→ did not advance)

References
Official Olympic Reports

Nations at the 1972 Summer Olympics
1972
1972 in Liberian sport